Ander Elosegi Alkain (born 14 November 1987) is a Spanish slalom canoeist who has competed at the international level since 2003.

He won a three medals at the ICF Canoe Slalom World Championships with two silvers (C1: 2019, C1 team: 2019) and a bronze (C1 team: 2009), all in La Seu d'Urgell. He also won two bronze medals at the European Championships.

Elosegi participated in four Olympic Games. He finished fourth in the C1 event at the 2008 Summer Olympics in Beijing and again in the same event at the 2012 Summer Olympics in London. At the 2016 Summer Olympics in Rio de Janeiro he finished 8th in the C1 event. He has qualified to represent Spain again at the 2020 Summer Olympics and he finished 8th in the C1 event.

World Cup individual podiums

References

External links

1987 births
Sportspeople from Irun
Canoeists at the 2008 Summer Olympics
Canoeists at the 2012 Summer Olympics
Canoeists at the 2016 Summer Olympics
Living people
Olympic canoeists of Spain
Spanish male canoeists
Medalists at the ICF Canoe Slalom World Championships
Canoeists from the Basque Country (autonomous community)
Canoeists at the 2020 Summer Olympics